Mermaid in Love is an Indonesian fantasy television series produced by Mega Kreasi Films which premiered on 2 May 2016 on SCTV. It stars Amanda Manopo, Angga Aldi Yunanda and Esa Sigit.

Apart from being a television series, this series was also made into a television film titled Lope Mermaid In Love in 2016 special to celebrate SCTV's anniversary. The second season of this series titled Mermaid In Love 2 Dunia which aired on 5 December 2016. It stars Amanda Manopo, Angga Aldi Yunanda and Bastian Steel. and re-run on 16 December 2017.

Plot 
Ariel (Amanda Manopo) is a mermaid who lives far from the seabed. Ariel is one of the mermaids who can't stay still and always wants to find a new life. Uniquely, he really likes to carry a cell phone around his neck. This is because Ariel is never separated from his gadgets. He is jealous of human life on land who always posts food on social media.

Ariel herself is very obsessed with ordinary human life. She also likes a guy who often comes to the beach where Ariel lives. He was bored because in his residence there were only women, while he craved handsome men.

One day Ariel and his friend, Buled (Meinorizah), are playing in the ocean, they both meet two handsome boys who are cool to jetski. At that moment they immediately fell in love with the two men. One of them is Troy (Esa Sigit). That afternoon, Troy came with his parents to celebrate the 17th birthday of Erick (Angga Aldi Yunanda), his younger brother. When he and Erick and Bhishma (Arnold Leonard) were busy playing a speed boat, Eric fell and drowned. Ariel thought it was Troy. Ariel rushed to help. However, he was surprised that it wasn't Troy he was helping. Erick also had time to see this beautiful mermaid.

Cast 
Amanda Manopo as Ariel
Angga Aldi Yunanda as Eric
Esa Sigit as Troy
Rebecca Klopper as Sasya Van Derkock 
Syifa Hadju as Maya 
Deswita Maharani as Euis 
Elina Joerg as Raina 
Arnold Leonard as Bisma 
Jovita Karen as Cindy 
Adzwa Aurell as Mimi 
Bryan Andrew as Justin 
Ferry Maryadi as Charly Van Derkock 
Adelia Rasya as Fatimah
Allya Rossa as Bunda 
Naufal Samudra as Roby
Mat Rozi as Thamrin 
Erma Zarina as Mamik 
Rully Ramadhani as Tini 
Renald Ramadhan as Bara
Meinorizah as Buled 
Neni Anggraeni as Madam Mermaid
Rully Fiss as Bembi
Laila Sari as Mbah 
Beby Tsabina as Ruby
Indra Birowo as Abah
Kevin Hillers as Rangga

Production

Filming 
On 8 August 2016 the show completed 100 episodes.

Controversy

IBC give written warning 
Indonesian Broadcasting Commission (IBC) imposed a written sanction on the 22 August 2016 broadcast due to showing the students that boys want to achieve with the conversation "can you just not help me just once", "Ril, because your love gave me courage", "but ril, your life is more valuable...", "Ril , I don't care how big the risk is, because I'm afraid of losing you ril… without you and me there would be no us Ril”, “I've never felt this big”.. and showing a scene of a boy and a girl holding hands while saying "because I always want to be with you.. you may not be a perfect girl, but I don't care, because since your presence my life has become more perfect, you are the reason why I I can smile at my most difficult times, I can't live without you".

References 

Indonesian drama television series
Indonesian television soap operas